Anaesthetis testacea is a species of longhorn beetle. It is a common species in Europe that develops in the dead, terminal twigs of deciduous trees and shrubs.

References

Desmiphorini
Beetles of Europe
Beetles described in 1781